Thisara Dilshan (born 8 February 2000) is a Sri Lankan cricketer. He made his Twenty20 debut on 8 January 2020, for Galle Cricket Club in the 2019–20 SLC Twenty20 Tournament. He made his first-class debut on 7 February 2020, for Galle Cricket Club in Tier B of the 2019–20 Premier League Tournament. He made his List A debut on 24 March 2021, for Galle Cricket Club in the 2020–21 Major Clubs Limited Over Tournament.

References

External links
 

2000 births
Living people
Sri Lankan cricketers
Galle Cricket Club cricketers
Place of birth missing (living people)